Rachel Gibson may refer to:

Rachel Gibson (writer), American romance novelist
Rachel Gibson (Alias), fictional character played by Rachel Nichols in the spy-fi television series Alias